Grace Adele Freebey (January 25, 1885 – March 30, 1943) was an American pianist, music teacher, and composer, based in Los Angeles.

Early life and education 
Freebey was born in Cuyahoga Falls, Ohio, the daughter of Charles Peter Freebey and Joanna Estelle Walsh Freebey. Her mother was born in Canada. In childhood, she moved to Los Angeles with her parents and siblings. She studied piano with A. J. Stamm, Marie von Unschuld, Louis Bachner, and Ernest Hutcheson, and composition with conductor Henry Schoenefeld.

Career 
Freebey performed as a concert pianist, and was accompanist for singers Ernestine Schumann-Heink and  Ellen Beach Yaw, and cellists May Mukle and Alfred Wallenstein. In 1914 she toured in vaudeville with Wallenstein, a child prodigy. She was a member of the Schliewen Trio, with Wallenstein and violinist Richard Schliewen. She was business manager and accompanist of the all-woman Sunny Southland Trio.  

Freebey taught piano classes at her own studio in Los Angeles, and at the Wilson-Greene School of Music, and as head of the piano department at Martha Washington Seminary in Washington, D.C. 

Tunes composed by Freebey, including "My Dearest Wish" (1911), "O Golden Sun" (1912),  "North Wind", "Wind of the West", "May Day", "Calling You", "Somebody's Coming", "Love's Resignation", "Just You and My Homeland" (1919), "My Golden California" (1924) and "Think of Me Sometimes" (1929), were performed by Schumann-Heink, Tsianina Redfeather, Jeanne Jomelli,Johanna Gadski, David Bispham, Constance Balfour, the People's Orchestra of Los Angeles, and other popular singers and musical groups.

Personal life 
Freebey died at her home in Los Angeles in 1943, at the age of 58. Her grave is in Angelus-Rosedale Cemetery.

References

External links 

 Sheet music for "O Golden Sun" by Grace Adele Freebey (1913), from IN Harmony: Sheet Music from Indiana, Indiana University
 Sheet music for "May Day" by Grace Adele Freebey (1909), from the Claremont Colleges Digital Library

1885 births
1943 deaths
People from Cuyahoga Falls, Ohio
American women pianists
American women composers